María Elena Maseras Ribera (25 May 1853 – 4 December 1905), also known as Elena Maseras, was a Spanish woman who was allowed to enlist as a university student with special dispensation from King Amadeo I in 1872; having been formally admitted to a class in 1875, she was finally allowed to graduate in 1882, which created a precedent allowing women to enroll at universities in Spain from that point on. She studied medicine at the University of Barcelona, but did not sit the last exam to qualify to practice as a physician, and became a teacher instead.

Some gardens in the Ensanche district were named after her.

Further reading
 Corbella, Jacinto, and Domenech, Edelmira.  "A question of priority: Elena Maseras, Dolors Aleu, Martina Castells," in Proceedings of the First International Congress of the History of Catalan Medicine (Montpellier), 1970, vol.  I, pp. 139–142. 
 Garcia, Betsabé. Barcelona amb nom de dona, published by Editorial Mediterrània and Barcelona City Council.

References

1853 births
1905 deaths
Spanish educators
Spanish women educators
19th-century Spanish people
University of Barcelona alumni
Spanish women physicians